Uncial 0262 (in the Gregory-Aland numbering), is a Greek uncial manuscript of the New Testament. Paleographically it has been assigned to the 7th century.

Description 

The codex contains small part of the First Epistle to Timothy 1:15-16, on one parchment leaf (9,5 cm by 13 cm). It is survived in a fragmentary condition. Probably it was written in two columns per page, 6 lines per page, in uncial letters.

Currently it is dated by the INTF to the 7th century.

It was examined by Kurt Treu and Horseley.

Text 

 Col I 
 [πισ]τος ω λλοκος 
 και πασης αποτοχης 
 αξιος οτι Χριστος Ις 
 [ηλθεν] ει[ς τ]ων 
 [κοσμον αμα]ρ 
 [τωλους σωσαι] 

 Col II
 ομ προτος ιμιν 
 εγω, αλα δια τατο 
 ελεηθην; ινα εν ε 
 μοι προτω ενδι[ξη] 
 τε Χς; [Ις] την [απα] 
 [σαν μακροθυμιαν] 
[transcribed by Kurt Treu]

The original orthography is heavily phoneticized. Treu provides the following transcription orthography normalized. 

The text-type of this codex is mixed. Aland placed it in Category III.

Location 

Currently the codex is housed at the Berlin State Museums (P. 13977) in Berlin.

See also 

 List of New Testament uncials
 Textual criticism
 Uncial 0259

References

Further reading 

 Kurt Treu, "Neue Neutestamentliche Fragmente der Berliner Papyrussammlung", APF 18 (Berlin: 1966), pp. 23-38. 
 G. H. R. Horseley, "New Documents Illustrating Early Christianity" 2 (Macquarie University, 1982), pp. 125-140. 
 Peter Head, Two Parchments Witnessing First Timothy 1 (2007)

Greek New Testament uncials
7th-century biblical manuscripts